Alan Dunn may refer to:
 Alan Dunn (baseball)
 Alan Dunn (cartoonist)

See also
 Alan Dunne, Irish footballer